The 52nd New York Infantry Regiment (or German Rangers, or Sigel Rifles) was an infantry regiment in the Union Army during the American Civil War.

Service
The 52nd New York Infantry was organized at New York City, New York beginning August 3, 1861, and mustered in for three years service on October 11, 1861, under the command of Colonel Paul A. Frank.  The regiment was created by the consolidation of six companies known as the "German Rangers" under Colonel Emil Von Schoening with four companies known as the "Sigel Rifles" under the command of Colonel Frank. (At the time of the consolidation part of the "Honved Regiment", under the command of Colonel Edward Count Wratislaw, had already been merged into the "German Rangers".)

The regiment was attached to French's 3rd Brigade, Sumner's Division, Army of the Potomac, to March 1862. 3rd Brigade, Richardson's 1st Division, II Corps, Army of the Potomac, to August 1862. 1st Brigade, 1st Division, II Corps, to September 1862. 3rd Brigade, 1st Division, II Corps, to June 1864. Consolidated Brigade, 1st Division, II Corps, to November 1862. 3rd Brigade, 1st Division, II Corps, to July 1865.

The 52nd New York Infantry mustered out of service on July 25, 1865.

Detailed service
Left New York for Washington, D.C., November 11, 1861.

Duty in the defenses of Washington, D.C., until March 1862. Advance on Manassas, Va., March 10–15.

Moved to the Peninsula, Va., April 3.

Siege of Yorktown April 5-May 4.

Battle of Fair Oaks or Seven Pines May 31-June 1.

Seven days before Richmond June 25-July 1. Battles of Gaines Mill June 27. Peach Orchard and Savage Station June 29. White Oak Swamp and Glendale June 30. Malvern Hill July 1.

At Harrison's Landing until August 16.

Movement to Fortress Monroe, then to Alexandria and Centreville August 16–30.

Cover Pope's retreat to Fairfax Court House September 1.

Maryland Campaign September 6–22. Battles of Antietam Creek September 15–16. Antietam September 17.

Duty at Harper's Ferry, Va., September 22-October 29.

Reconnaissance to Charlestown October 16–17.

Advance up Loudoun Valley and movement to Falmouth, Va., October 29-November 17.

Battle of Fredericksburg December 12–15.

"Mud March" January 20–24, 1863.

At Falmouth, Va., until April 27.

Chancellorsville Campaign April 27-May 6. Battle of Chancellorsville May 1–5.

Gettysburg Campaign June 11-July 24. Battle of Gettysburg, July 1–3. Pursuit of Lee July 5–24.

Duty on line of the Rappahannock until October. Advance from the Rappahannock to the Rapidan September 13–17.

Bristoe Campaign October 9–22. Auburn and Bristoe October 14.

Advance to line of the Rappahannock November 7–8.

Mine Run Campaign November 26-December 2.

At Stevensburg until May 1864.

Demonstration on the Rapidan February 6–7, 1864.

Campaign from the Rapidan to the James May 3-June 15. Battles of the Wilderness May 5–7; Spotsylvania May 8–12; Po River May 10; Spotsylvania Court House May 12–21. Assault on the Salient or "Bloody Angle" May 12. North Anna River May 23–26. On line of the Pamunkey May 26–28. Totopotomoy May 28–31. Cold Harbor June 1–12.

Before Petersburg June 16–18. Siege of Petersburg June 16, 1864, to April 2, 1865.

Jerusalem Plank Road, Weldon Railroad, June 22–23, 1864.

Demonstration north of the James July 27–29. First Battle of Deep Bottom July 27–28.

Demonstration north of the James August 13–20. Deep Bottom, August 14–18.

Ream's Station August 25.

Reconnaissance to Hatcher's Run December 9–10.

Dabney's Mills, Hatcher's Run, February 5–7, 1865.

Watkins' House March 25. Appomattox Campaign March 28-April 9. Hatcher's Run or Boydton Road March 31. White Oak Road March 31. Sutherland Station and fall of Petersburg April 2. Sailor's Creek April 6. High Bridge and Farmville April 7. Appomattox Court House April 9. Surrender of Lee and his army.

At Burkesville until May 2. March to Washington, D.C., May 2–15.

Grand Review of the Armies May 23. Duty at Washington, D.C., until July.

Casualties
The regiment lost a total of 352 men during service; 14 officers and 138 enlisted men killed or mortally wounded, 1 officer and 199 enlisted men died of disease.

Commanders
 Colonel Paul A. Frank
 Colonel Henry M. Karples
 Lieutenant Colonel Charles G. Freudenberg - commanded at the Battle of Gettysburg until wounded on July 2, 1863, while in temporary command of the brigade
 Major Edward Venuti - commanded at the Battle of Gettysburg until killed in action
 Captain William Scherrer - commanded at the Battle of Gettysburg
 Captain George Degener - commanded at the First Battle of Deep Bottom

Notable members
 Sergeant William Westerhold, Company G - Medal of Honor recipient for action at the Battle of Spotsylvania Court House (he was subsequently promoted to 1st lieutenant)

See also

 List of New York Civil War regiments
 New York in the Civil War
 German Americans in the American Civil War

References
 Dyer, Frederick H. A Compendium of the War of the Rebellion (Des Moines, IA:  Dyer Pub. Co.), 1908.
 Frank, Emil H. Reminiscences of the Civil War, 1861-1863 (S.l.: s.n.), ca. 1900.
Attribution

External links
 Regimental color of the 52nd New York Infantry
 52nd New York Infantry Monument at Gettysburg

Military units and formations established in 1861
Military units and formations disestablished in 1865
Infantry 052
1861 establishments in New York (state)